"A Fire I Can't Put Out" is a song written by Darryl Staedtler, and recorded by American country music singer George Strait.  It was released in May 1983 as the fourth and final single from his album Strait from the Heart.  It was Strait's second Number One hit on the Billboard country charts.

Content
The narrator is a guy that can't let the memory of a woman escape him. He can't let go of the feeling that felt so good when he was with her. He knows he has to move on and find someone new, but he just can't let the fire that burns for his former lover go.

Charts

Weekly charts

Year-end charts

References

1983 singles
George Strait songs
MCA Records singles
1982 songs